Charles Philip Ford (born 1 May 1985) is an English professional golfer who currently plays on the European Tour.

Ford attended the University of Tennessee in the United States before turning professional in 2009. He qualified for the second tier Challenge Tour for the 2010 season by reaching the final stage of qualifying school at the end of 2009. He quickly made an impact by winning in his second appearance on the tour, at the Turkish Airlines Challenge, edging out Oscar Florén in a playoff. Ford played on the Challenge Tour from 2010 to 2017. 2017 was his most successful since 2010 and he finished 28th in the Order of Merit. He finished tied for second place at the 2017 European Tour qualifying school to earn his place on the 2018 European Tour.

Professional wins (1)

Challenge Tour wins (1)

Challenge Tour playoff record (1–0)

Team appearances
Amateur
Palmer Cup (representing Europe): 2008 (winners)
European Amateur Team Championship (representing England): 2008, 2009

Professional
European Championships (representing Great Britain): 2018

See also
2017 European Tour Qualifying School graduates

References

External links

Charlie Ford at the University of Tennessee Athletics official site

English male golfers
Tennessee Volunteers men's golfers
European Tour golfers
Sportspeople from Leicester
1985 births
Living people